Di Paolo is an Italian surname, and may refer to:
Nick Di Paolo, American comedian
Giovanni di Paolo, Italian painter
Giovanni di Paolo Rucellai, Italian merchant
Tonio di Paolo, American opera singer
Jacopo di Paolo, Italian painter
Antonia di Paolo di Dono, Italian painter
Patrizia Di Paolo, Italian musician
Luca di Paolo da Matelica, Italian painter
Ilio DiPaolo, Italian wrestler
Marco Di Paolo, Italian footballer
Ezequiel Di Paolo, scientist
Giannicola di Paolo, Italian painter
Andrea Di Paolo, Italian pianist
Fabricio Di Paolo, Brazilian pianist

See also
DiPaolo

Italian-language surnames
Patronymic surnames
Surnames from given names